Mahāvīra (or Mahaviracharya, "Mahavira the Teacher") was a 9th-century Jain mathematician possibly born in Mysore, in India. He authored Gaṇitasārasan̄graha (Ganita Sara Sangraha) or the Compendium on the gist of Mathematics in 850 AD. He was patronised by the Rashtrakuta king Amoghavarsha. He separated astrology from mathematics. It is the earliest Indian text entirely devoted to mathematics. He expounded on the same subjects on which Aryabhata and Brahmagupta contended, but he expressed them more clearly. His work is a highly syncopated approach to algebra and the emphasis in much of his text is on developing the techniques necessary to solve algebraic problems.  He is highly respected among Indian mathematicians, because of his establishment of terminology for concepts such as equilateral, and isosceles triangle; rhombus; circle and semicircle. Mahāvīra's eminence spread throughout South India and his books proved inspirational to other mathematicians in Southern India. It was translated into the Telugu language by Pavuluri Mallana as Saara Sangraha Ganitamu.

He discovered algebraic identities like a3 = a (a + b) (a − b) + b2 (a − b) + b3. He also found out the formula for nCr as [n (n − 1) (n − 2) ... (n − r + 1)] / [r (r − 1) (r − 2) ... 2 * 1]. He devised a formula which approximated the area and perimeters of ellipses and found methods to calculate the square of a number and cube roots of a number. He asserted that the square root of a negative number does not exist.

Rules for decomposing fractions
Mahāvīra's Gaṇita-sāra-saṅgraha gave systematic rules for expressing a fraction as the sum of unit fractions.

In the Gaṇita-sāra-saṅgraha (GSS), the second section of the chapter on arithmetic is named kalā-savarṇa-vyavahāra (lit. "the operation of the reduction of fractions"). In this, the bhāgajāti section (verses 55–98) gives rules for the following:

 To express 1 as the sum of n unit fractions (GSS kalāsavarṇa 75, examples in 76):

 

 To express 1 as the sum of an odd number of unit fractions (GSS kalāsavarṇa 77):
 

 To express a unit fraction  as the sum of n other fractions with given numerators  (GSS kalāsavarṇa 78, examples in 79):
 

 To express any fraction  as a sum of unit fractions (GSS kalāsavarṇa 80, examples in 81):
 Choose an integer i such that  is an integer r, then write
 
 and repeat the process for the second term, recursively. (Note that if i is always chosen to be the smallest such integer, this is identical to the greedy algorithm for Egyptian fractions.)

 To express a unit fraction as the sum of two other unit fractions (GSS kalāsavarṇa 85, example in 86):
  where  is to be chosen such that  is an integer (for which  must be a multiple of ).
 

  where  is to be chosen such that  divides 

Some further rules were given in the Gaṇita-kaumudi of Nārāyaṇa in the 14th century.

See also
 List of Indian mathematicians

Notes

References
Bibhutibhusan Datta and Avadhesh Narayan Singh (1962). History of Hindu Mathematics: A Source Book.
 (Available, along with many other entries from other encyclopaedias for other Mahāvīra-s, online.)

 

9th-century Indian mathematicians
9th-century Indian Jains
Scholars from Karnataka
Acharyas